Statistics of Emperor's Cup (a Japanese association football competition) in the 1951 season.

Overview
It was contested by 14 teams, and Keio BRB won the championship.

Results

1st Round
Niraha Club 2–0 Nittetsu Futase
All Rikkyo 7–0 Morioka Soccer
Matsuyama Commercial High School 0–10 Keio BRB
Waseda University WMW 8–0 Sapporo Club
Kariya Club 1–4 Sendai Soccer
Toyama Soccer 0–1 Okayama University

Quarterfinals
All Kwangaku 2–0 Niraha Club
All Rikkyo 0–1 Keio BRB
Waseda University WMW 0–1 Sendai Soccer
Okayama University 0–9 Osaka Club

Semifinals
All Kwangaku 0–4 Keio BRB
Sendai Soccer 1–6 Osaka Club

Final
     
Keio BRB 3–2 Osaka Club
Keio BRB won the championship.

References
 NHK

Emperor's Cup
1951 in Japanese football